Kansas is a village in Kansas Township, Edgar County, Illinois. The population was 670 at the 2020 census.

Geography
Kansas is located in southwest Edgar County approximately 1.2 miles from the Edgar-Coles county line. The community is at the intersection of Illinois routes 16 and 49 approximately ten miles southwest of Paris.

History
A post office called Kansas has been in operation since 1855. The town was named after the Kansas Territory.

In or before 1972, students and their physical education teacher at the high school invented a game called Deckerball. This has been credited as being the possible origin of the very similar game Wallyball.

Demographics
As of the 2020 census there were 670 people, 339 households, and 183 families residing in the village. The racial makeup of the village was 91.04% White, 1.04% African American, 0.30% Native American, 0.30% Asian, 0.15% from other races, and 7.16% from two or more races. Hispanic or Latino of any race were 1.49% of the population.

There were 339 households, out of which 52.51% had children under the age of 18 living with them, 38.05% were married couples living together, 12.98% had a female householder with no husband present, and 46.02% were non-families. 36.58% of all households were made up of individuals, and 19.76% had someone living alone who was 65 years of age or older. The average household size was 3.10 and the average family size was 2.27.

The village's age distribution consisted of 25.3% under the age of 18, 7.7% from 18 to 24, 19.7% from 25 to 44, 30.3% from 45 to 64, and 17.0% who were 65 years of age or older. The median age was 44.5 years. For every 100 females, there were 95.2 males. For every 100 females age 18 and over, there were 94.6 males.

The median income for a household in the village was $36,375, and the median income for a family was $51,827. Males had a median income of $45,714 versus $32,813 for females. The per capita income for the village was $29,752. About 21.9% of families and 20.8% of the population were below the poverty line, including 29.2% of those under age 18 and 9.2% of those age 65 or over.

Education
Secondary education is provided by a public high school, Kansas High School. The school team's nickname was the Bulldogs until 2004,  when it became the Titans.

Notable people
John Honnold (1915–2011), former law professor at the University of Pennsylvania Law School

References

External links
 

Villages in Edgar County, Illinois
Villages in Illinois